Kevin Sack, an American journalist, is a senior reporter for The New York Times.

Sack shared a Pulitzer Prize for National Reporting in 2001 for a New York Times series on race.

While at The Los Angeles Times, he received the 2003 Pulitzer Prize for National Reporting, with Alan Miller, for their revelatory and moving examination of a military aircraft, nicknamed "The Widow Maker," that was linked to the deaths of 45 pilots.

He was a member of The New York Times reporting team that received the 2015 Pulitzer Prize for International Reporting for coverage of the 2014 Ebola virus epidemic in West Africa. Team members named by The Times were Pam Belluck, Helene Cooper, Sheri Fink, Adam Nossiter, Norimitsu Onishi, Sack, and Ben C. Solomon.

Career
Before joining the Times, Sack was a national correspondent in the Atlanta bureau of The Los Angeles Times, Atlanta bureau chief and correspondent for The New York Times, and a reporter for The Atlanta Journal-Constitution.

Education
Sack is a graduate of Duke University, 1981, with a B.A. in history. He attended the University of Witwatersrand in South Africa on a Rotary Foundation fellowship.

References

 http://6thfloor.blogs.nytimes.com/2013/12/09/behind-the-cover-story-kevin-sack-on-his-friendship-with-a-lost-boy/
 http://www.pulitzer.org/works/2015-International-Reporting

External links
Kevin Sack archive, The New York Times
, Pulitzer Prize-winning articles on Ebola

Kevin Sack new article on three-time Pulitzer winner 

American newspaper reporters and correspondents
Los Angeles Times people
Living people
The New York Times writers
The Atlanta Journal-Constitution people
Duke University Trinity College of Arts and Sciences alumni
Year of birth missing (living people)
Pulitzer Prize for National Reporting winners
University of the Witwatersrand alumni